Will Wilson (born 1957) is an American artist known for portrait paintings, illustrations and Trompe L'Oeil works. His works are held in the collections of the Smithsonian's National Portrait Gallery.

Early life and education 
Wilson was born on August 18, 1957. He attended the Schuler School of Fine Arts, in his hometown of Baltimore, Maryland, from 1975-1979.

Career 
Wilson currently lives and works in San Francisco, California.

An illustration by Wilson was featured as the cover art on Michael Jackson album Blood on the Dance Floor: HIStory in the Mix released in 1997.

In June 2008, former Maryland governor Bob Ehrlich Jr. unveiled his official portrait painted by Will Wilson. The two were childhood friends in Baltimore, Maryland. A portrait of Reynolds Price painted by Wilson is held in the collection of the National Portrait Gallery in Washington, D.C.

References

Artists from Baltimore
American male painters
Painters from Maryland
Living people
1957 births
20th-century American painters
21st-century American painters
20th-century American male artists